Catherine of Russia can refer to:

 Catherine I of Russia (1684–1727), second wife of Peter the Great
 Catherine II of Russia (1729–1796), called Catherine the Great, wife of Peter III of Russia
 Maria Buynosova-Rostovskaya, born Ekaterina (d. 1626), second wife of Vasili IV of Russia
 Tsarevna Catherine Alekseyevna of Russia (1658–1718), daughter of Alexis I of Russia
 Tsarevna Catherine Ivanovna of Russia (1691–1733), daughter of Ivan V of Russia
 Ekaterina Alekseyevna Dolgorukova (1712–1747), fiancée of Peter II of Russia
 Grand Duchess Catherine Antonovna of Russia (1741–1807), sister of Ivan IV of Russia, imprisoned with family by Empress Elizabeth
 Catherine Pavlovna of Russia (1788–1819), daughter of Paul I of Russia, wife of Duke George of Oldenburg and later William I of Württemberg
 Grand Duchess Catherine Mikhailovna of Russia (1827–1894), daughter of Grand Duke Michael Pavlovich of Russia, wife of Duke Georg August of Mecklenburg-Strelitz
 Catherine of Russia (film), a 1963 French-Italian film